Trite parvula, commonly known as the house hopper spider, is a small and relatively common jumping spider (Salticidae) endemic to New Zealand.

Classification
As of 2017, it is one of fifteen verified species of Trite.

Distribution and habitat
It lives throughout the North Island and the top half of the South Island down to Christchurch. It often lives inside houses and is seen sunning itself on walls, fences and garden plants.

References

Further reading
 Bryant, E. (1935). "Some new and little known species of New Zealand spiders". Records of the Canterbury Museum. 4. pp. 54–70.

Salticidae
Spiders of New Zealand
Spiders described in 1935